The 1895 South Australian Football Association season was the 19th season of the top-level Australian rules football competition in South Australia.

The 'Port' Natives Club (renamed as West Torrens from 1897) was formed as a new Club by a group of players not tied to any District including some periphery Port Adelaide players who wanted more playing time. The club's application to join the Senior competition was approved.

A summary of the 1895 season, including Tables of Games won, goal and behinds scored by each club vs each other club, top goal kickers, and a list of 1st and 2nd places since 1877 was published in the SA Register.

Ladder

References 

SANFL
South Australian National Football League seasons